Shahiduzzaman Selim (born January 5) is a Bangladeshi theatre, television and film actor. He won the Bangladesh National Film Award for Best Actor in Negative Role for his performance in the film Chorabali (2012). He is currently the president of Actors’ Equity Bangladesh.

Early life
Selim studied in Tangail Bindubashini Government High School up to class two. Then he came to Dhaka and passed SSC examination from Motijheel Ideal School. He was then admitted into the department of economics of  Jahangirnagar University. He joined Dhaka Theatre in 1983 while he was a university student.

Career
In 1989, Selim started his acting career in television through his role in the drama  Jonaki Jwoley. He made four digital films titled Mixed Culture, Ekjon Ajmal Hossain, Abinashi Shabdorashi and Chicago Hridoy in 2008, jointly produced by Chicago Bioscope (US) and Dream Factory (Bangladesh) and shooting of these film were in the United States. Ekjon Ajmal Hossain participated in the Independent Film Festival in the US. He directed DB, a detective TV drama serial in 2012, and Ek Jhak Mrito Jonaki in 2015. Selim has also made two tele-dramas titled Somoy Osomoy and Fera Ar Na Ferar Majhe. He attended North American Film Festivals where his acted film Bapjaner Bio-scope were shown. Selim is also the caller of "Jahangirnagar University Media Society" (JUMS).

Awards and nominations

Television Appearances

Acted dramas

Directed TV dramas

TV Programs
 "Amar Ami" on Banglavision in 2012

Directed theatre dramas
 Ponchonari Akkhyan (2015) written by Harun Rashid

Web series

Filmography

Personal life
Selim is married to actress Rosey Siddique. Together they have two daughters. In his early years he used to work for Reneta Pharmaceuticals Ltd. He studied in Jahangirnagar University in economics department.

References

External links
 
 Shahiduzzaman Selim at the Bangla Movie Database

Male actors in Bengali cinema
Living people
20th-century Bangladeshi male actors
Bangladeshi male film actors
Best Performance in a Negative Role National Film Award (Bangladesh) winners
Jahangirnagar University alumni
Notre Dame College, Dhaka alumni
Year of birth missing (living people)